The 45th Golden Horse Awards (Mandarin:第45屆金馬獎) took place on December 6, 2008 at Zhongshan Hall in Taichung, Taiwan.

References

45th
2008 film awards
2008 in Taiwan